Cytochrome P450 4F12 is a protein that in humans is encoded by the CYP4F12 gene.

This gene encodes a member of the cytochrome P450 superfamily of enzymes and is part of a cluster of cytochrome P450 genes on chromosome 19. The cytochrome P450 proteins are monooxygenases which catalyze many reactions involved in drug metabolism and synthesis of cholesterol, steroids and other lipids. This protein likely localizes to the endoplasmic reticulum. CYP4F12 is expressed in the liver and throughout the gastrointestinal track, is known to metabolize the anti-histamine drugs, ebastine and terfenadine, and therefore is suggested to be positioned for and possibly involved in the processing of these and perhaps other drugs.

When expressed in yeast the enzyme is capable of oxidizing arachidonic acid by adding a hydroxyl residue to carbons 18 or 19 to form 18-hydroxyeicosatetraenoic acid (18-HETE) or 19-HETE; however, its physiological function in doing so has not been determined.  CYP4F12 also metabolizes prostaglandin H2 (PGH2) and PGH1 to their corresponding 19-hydroxyl analogs in a reaction that might serve to reduce their activities. In addition to these monooxygenase actions, CYP458 possesses epoxygenase activity: it metabolizes the omega-3 fatty acids, docosahexaenoic acid (DHA) and eicosapentaenoic acid, (EPA) to their corresponding epoxides, the epoxydocosapentaenoic acids (EDPs) and epoxyeicosatetraenoic acids (EEQs), respectively. The enzyme metabolizes DHA primarily to 19R,20S-epoxyeicosapentaenoic acid and 19S,20R-epoxyeicosapentaenoic acid isomers (termed 19,20-EDP) and EPA primarily to 17R,18S-eicosatetraenoic acid and 17S,18R-eicosatetraenoic acid isomers (termed 17,18-EEQ). 19-HETE is an inhibitor of 20-HETE, a broadly active signaling molecule which acts to constrict arterioles, elevate blood pressure, promote inflammation responses, and stimulates the growth of various types of tumor cells; however the in vivo ability and significance of 19-HETE in inhibiting 20-HETE has not been demonstrated (see 20-Hydroxyeicosatetraenoic acid). The EDPs (see Epoxydocosapentaenoic acid) and EEQs (see epoxyeicosatetraenoic acid) have a broad range of activities. In various animal models and in vitro studies on animal and human tissues, they decrease hypertension and pain perception; suppress inflammation; inhibit angiogenesis, endothelial cell migration and endothelial cell proliferation; and inhibit the growth and metastasis of human breast and prostate cancer cell lines. It is suggested that the EDP and EEQ metabolites function in humans as they do in animal models and that, as products of the omega-3 fatty acids, DHA acid and EPA, the EDP and EEQ metabolites contribute to many of the beneficial effects attributed to dietary omega-3 fatty acids.  EDP and EEQ metabolites are short-lived, being inactivated within seconds or minutes of formation by epoxide hydrolases, particularly soluble epoxide hydrolase, and therefore act locally.

The fatty acid metabolizing activity, including the ability to form epoxides, of CYP4F12 is very similar to that of CYP4F8.  However, it and CYP4F8 are not regarded as being major contributors in forming the cited epoxides in humans although they might do so in tissues where they are highly expressed.

References

External links

Further reading